Lanctôt is a surname. Notable people with the surname include:

Adélard Lanctôt (1874–1919), Canadian lawyer and politician
Gustave Lanctot (1883–1975), Canadian historian and archivist
Jacques Lanctôt (born 1945), Canadian writer and convicted kidnapper
Louise Lanctôt (born 1947), Canadian writer and convicted kidnapper
Micheline Lanctôt (born 1947), Canadian actress, film director, screenwriter and musician
Robert Lanctôt (born 1963), Canadian politician
Roch Lanctôt (1866–1929), Canadian politician